Diego Salgado Costa de Menezes, or simply Diego (born 2 February 1982), is a retired Brazilian footballer who played as a goalkeeper.

Career
Diego made his professional debut for Flamengo against Atlético Paranaense in a 3–2 home victory on 11 September 2002 in the Brazilian Série A.

In January 2009, he signed with Madureira, and right after loaned back to Flamengo. On 10 July 2009 he left Madureira signing once again with Flamengo.

In January 2010, Diego signed for Ceará.

Career statistics
(Correct )

according to combined sources on the Flamengo official website and Flaestatística.

Honours
Flamengo
Taça Guanabara: 2004, 2007, 2008
Taça Rio: 2009
Rio de Janeiro State League: 2004, 2007, 2008, 2009
Brazilian Cup: 2006
Brazilian Série A: 2009

Avaí
Santa Catarina State League: 2012

References

External links
 CBF
 Guardian Stats Centre
 globoesporte
 goal.com
 fl.com
 www.zerozerofootball.com

1982 births
Living people
Brazilian footballers
CR Flamengo footballers
Ceará Sporting Club players
Avaí FC players
Mirassol Futebol Clube players
Campeonato Brasileiro Série A players
Association football goalkeepers
People from São Gonçalo, Rio de Janeiro
Sportspeople from Rio de Janeiro (state)